The Department of the Columbia was a major command (Department) of the United States Army during the 19th century.

Formation
On July 27, 1865 the Military Division of the Pacific was created under Major General Henry W. Halleck, replacing the Department of the Pacific, consisting of the Department of the Columbia (replacing the District of Oregon) that now consisted of the state of Oregon and the territories of Washington and Idaho and the expanded Department of California.

Within the Department was the District of Boise, 1865-67 and District of Owyhee, 1867-69 that were engaged in the Snake War.  

The Military District of Alaska, subordinate to the Department of the Columbia, was formed in 1867 following the purchase of Alaska. On March 18, 1868, the Army established the Department of Alaska under the Division of the Pacific.  The Department of Alaska was discontinued on July 1, 1870, and Alaska was absorbed again by the Department of the Columbia.

In June 1875, the part of the Territory of Idaho that lay east of the extension of the western boundary of Utah, and including Fort Hall, was detached from the Department of Columbia and added to the Department of the Platte.

When the Military Division of the Pacific was discontinued on July 3, 1891.  Each of its three subordinate departments including the Department of the Columbia, then reported directly to the War Department.

Commanders of the Military Department of Columbia
 Brigadier General George Wright, July 27, 1865 – July 30, 1865
 Colonel George Byron Currey, July 27, 1865 – November 20, 1865
 Lieutenant Colonel John M. Drake, November 20, 1865 – December 22, 1865
 Major General Frederick Steele, December 21, 1865 – November 23, 1867
 Lieutenant Colonel George Crook, November 23, 1867 – August 8, 1870
 Brigadier General Edward Richard Sprigg Canby, August 8, 1870 – January 1873
 Colonel Jefferson Columbus Davis, January 1873 – September 1874
 Brigadier General Oliver Otis Howard, September 1874 – January 1881
 Brigadier General Nelson A. Miles, January 1881 – July 1885
 Brigadier General John Gibbon, July 1885 – April 1891
 Brigadier General August Kautz, April 1891 – January 1892

Posts in the Military Department of Columbia
 Fort Colville, Washington Territory, 1859–1882
 Fort Steilacoom, Washington Territory, 1849–1868
 Fort Dalles, Oregon, 1850–1867
 Fort Vancouver, Washington Territory, 1853–1879
 Fort Yamhill, Oregon, 1856–1866
 Fort Walla Walla, Washington Territory, 1856–1911
 Siletz Blockhouse, Oregon, 1858–1866  
 Post of San Juan, Washington Territory, 1863–1867
Fort Cape Disappointment, Washington Territory, 1864–1875 
 Fort Canby, 1875–
 Fort Lapwai, Idaho Territory, 1862–1884
 Fort Boise, Idaho Territory, 1863–1912
 Fort Klamath, Oregon, 1863–1890
 Fort at Point Adams, Oregon, 1863–1865 
Fort Stevens, Oregon, 1865 - 1947
 Camp Alvord, Oregon, 1864–1866 
 Camp Henderson, Oregon, 1864–1866 
 Camp Watson, Oregon, 1864–1869
 Camp Colfax, Oregon, 1865, 1867
 Camp Currey, Oregon, 1865–1866 
 Camp Lander, Idaho Territory, 1865–1866 
 Camp Logan, Oregon, 1865–1868 
 Camp Lyon, Idaho, 1865–1869 
 Camp Polk, Oregon, 1865–1866 
 Camp Reed, Idaho Territory, 1865–1866 
 Camp on Silvies River, Oregon ? 
 Camp Wright, Oregon 1865–1866 
 Old Camp Warner, Oregon, 1866–1867
 Camp Warner, Oregon, 1867–1874

References

Columbia
Military history of Oregon
Military history of Alaska
Military history of California
Military history of Idaho
Military history of Washington (state)
1865 establishments in Oregon